Munderfing is a municipality in the district of Braunau am Inn in the Austrian state of Upper Austria.

Geography
Munderfing lies on the western edge of the Kobernauß forest in the Innviertel. About 57 percent of the municipality is forest and 38 percent farmland.

References

Cities and towns in Braunau am Inn District